The Cowry Forces for an Emerging Benin  (FCBE) is a political party of Benin, formed by supporters of president Yayi Boni. In the parliamentary election held on 31 March 2007, the party won 35 out of 83 seats. The party expanded its plurality to 41 seats in the 2011 election that followed the contested reelection of Yayi Boni as president.

After President Boni Yayi had served maximum two five-year terms, Lionel Zinsou, the candidate for Cowry Forces for an Emerging Benin (FCBE), lost the March 2016 presidential election to Patrice Talon.

A controversial new electoral code introduced in July 2018 saw the party fail to be validated to run in the 2019 Beninese parliamentary election.

Electoral history

Parliamentary elections

References

Political parties in Benin
Political parties with year of establishment missing